John Oldfield may refer to:

 John Oldfield (footballer) (1943–2002), English footballer
 John Oldfield (engineer) (1937–2002),  British engineer and Ford executive
 John William Oldfield (1886–1955), figure in the commercial and public life in Ceylon

See also 
 Ted Oldfield (John Edward Oldfield, 1918–2006), English footballer